This is a list of matches of FC Dynamo Kyiv in Europe.

Overall record
Accurate as of 23 November 2021

Legend: GF = Goals For. GA = Goals Against. GD = Goal Difference.

Results

Finals

Lost semi-finals

UEFA Rankings since 2007

Source:

Games record

References 

Europe
Ukrainian football clubs in international competitions
Soviet football clubs in international competitions